Tempest-Marie Norlin (born 28 July 1991) is a Swedish football midfielder and forward currently playing for IF Brommapojkarna of the Elitettan.

References

External links
  
 
 
 

1991 births
Living people
Swedish women's footballers
Damallsvenskan players
Piteå IF (women) players
Women's association football midfielders
Women's association football forwards
Djurgårdens IF Fotboll (women) players
IF Brommapojkarna (women) players
Hammarby Fotboll (women) players
Elitettan players